A number of units of measurement were used in Madagascar to measure length, mass, capacity, etc.  The Metric system was introduced in Madagascar in 1897.

System before metric system

Several units were used.

Length

One rahf was equal to 46.46 in (1.18 m) (the value was double in the northern part of Madagascar).

Mass

For gold and silver

Units included:

1 vari = 3 nanki

1 sompi = 2 vari = 60 grain.

Capacity

One bambou was equal to 0.0568 bushel.

References

Malagasy culture
Madagascar